INJAZ Al-Arab  (Arabic: إنجاز العرب) is a non-profit organization for education and training in workforce readiness, financial literacy and entrepreneurship across the Arab World. INJAZ Al-Arab is the Regional Operating Center of JA Worldwide (JAW), one of the largest global non-governmental organizations dedicated to addressing fundamental social and economic challenges faced by young people. INJAZ Al-Arab is also an active participant in the United Nations Global Compact. Over 3.7 million students have participated in a broad base of entrepreneurship training opportunities aimed at developing basic business skills to start and run their own businesses while obtaining soft skills increasingly demanded by the private sector. Since its inception, INJAZ Al-Arab has built a network of over 88,000 classroom volunteers, who are leaders from the corporate world. INJAZ Al-Arab has a Regional Board of Directors, which comprises 24 executives that manage some companies and institutions, as well as a team of staff, led by Akef Aqrabawi, President and CEO of the Middle East/North Africa for JA Worldwide.

History 

INJAZ Al-Arab began its work in the Middle East & North Africa (MENA) region in 1999 and joining Junior Achievement, established its regional office in 2004. Since joining JA, and under INJAZ Al-Arab's founder and former CEO Soraya Salti's leadership, INJAZ grew in program availability, student participation, and reach. Today, it operates in 13 countries as a federation of national operations. INJAZ Al-Arab's network includes Algeria, Bahrain, Egypt, Kuwait, Lebanon, Morocco, Oman, Palestine, Qatar, Saudi Arabia, Tunisia, United Arab Emirates, and Yemen.

Activities 
INJAZ Al-Arab's programs focus on three core areas of business education which are:

Work Readiness: The widespread mismatch between the skills attained in school and those demanded by the private sector are feeding current youth unemployment rates. INJAZ Al-Arab programs build teamwork, critical thinking, problem-solving, communication, and leadership skills employers look for. 
Financial Literacy: Teaching young people about responsible money management is key to building their own financial security and an economically prosperous future for themselves.
Entrepreneurship: Entrepreneurship education prepares youth to be responsible, enterprising individuals. Immersing them in real-life learning experiences allows them to take measured risks, manage the results, and learn from the outcomes. This growing number of youth-led enterprises creates new jobs and fuels economic development.

Sponsors 
Al Yaqout Group, Alghanim Industries, Aramex, Bechtel, Bin Zayed Group, Boeing, BNY Mellon, Citi Foundation, Deloitte, ExxonMobil, FedEx, Google, Hill+Knowlton Strategies, HSBC, Investcorp, Marriott International, MasterCard,  McKinsey & Company, MetLife, Microsoft, MBC Group, Ooredoo, PepsiCo, PRAGMA, Qatar Fund for Development, SABIC, SAP, Schneider Electric.

Knowledge Partners 
Bett MEA, Harvard Business Review, Localized, MIT Enterprise Forum, World Economic Forum, Oliver Wyman.

Awards & Publications 

INJAZ Al-Arab and Soraya Salti, former CEO, were awarded The Henry R. Kravis Prize in Nonprofit Leadership in 2012.

INJAZ Al-Arab, along with six other organizations throughout the world, was awarded the Skoll Foundation for Social Entrepreneurship in 2009.

A 2012 study supported by Citi Foundation by professors from Harvard and Dubai School of Government (now named Mohammed Bin Rashid School of Government) found that INJAZ Al-Arab alumni have a significantly shorter waiting period than other youth while searching for jobs after graduation.

Named one of the top 100 NGOs in the world by NGO Advisor for six consecutive years, INJAZ Al-Arab has influenced the lives of over (4) million students since its inception in 2004.

INJAZ has been recognized as part of the Harvard Global Education Initiative under the Harvard Graduate School of Education. The initiative recognizes INJAZ Al-Arab for putting 21 st century education into practice.

Professor Fernando M. Reimers of Harvard University published his book on INJAZ Al-Arab "Learning How to Improve the World: How INJAZ Al-Arab Helps Youth in the Middle East Develop an Entrepreneurial Mindset". The book is a study done by Reimers showing the impact of the Company Program on 800 students in six different MENA countries that are Member Nations of INJAZ Al-Arab.

INJAZ Al-Arab won the GOLD at the 2016 Middle East Public Relations Association (MEPRA) for best Corporate Social Responsibility.

INJAZ Al-Arab received the Takreem Foundation “Excellence in Education Award” for 2019.

The resilience and success of INJAZ Al-Arab’s network throughout the COVID-19 pandemic in 2020 was featured in Harvard Professor Fernando Reimers new published book "Leading Educational Change During a Pandemic- Reflections on Hope and Possibility". The book discusses how (28) entrepreneurial educators pivoted to sustain educational opportunities. Book contribution by Akef Aqrabawi.

INJAZ Al-Arab in the News 
Queen Rania of Jordan is a supporter of INJAZ Al-Arab. In 2015, she chaired a discussion with entrepreneurs in celebration of INJAZ Al-Arab's 10th anniversary, showcasing alumni's success stories.

INJAZ Al-Arab is frequent in the Skoll Foundation website, whose mission is to drive large-scale change by investing in, connecting, and celebrating social entrepreneurs and the innovators who help them solve the world’s most pressing problems.

INJAZ Al-Arab has been mentioned several times in The Skoll World Forum Online, a year-round platform that focuses on a variety of areas, including education and economic opportunity. The Skoll World Forum Online is affiliated with the Skoll Foundation. Akef Aqrabawi, President and CEO of Middle East/North Africa for Junior Achievement Worldwide. INJAZ Al-Arab has also been featured on the website.

Soraya Salti, who has also been awarded the Skoll Foundation Award in 2009, has been listed as a social entrepreneur with the Schwab Foundation for Social Entrepreneurship. According to Schwab, social entrepreneurs drive social innovation and transformation in various fields including education, health, environment and enterprise development.

References 

Youth organisations based in Jordan
Junior Achievement